Almanya: Welcome to Germany (Almanya is Turkish for Germany) is a 2011 German comedy film directed by Yasemin Şamdereli. The film premiered at the 61st Berlin International Film Festival in the section competition and won the Deutscher Filmpreis 2011 in the categories Best Script and Best Film.

The tragic comedy dramatizes the question of identity and belonging for former Turkish guest workers in Germany and their descendants. The film opened in German cinemas on 10 March and was the fourth most successful German film of 2011 with 1.5 million viewers.

Cast
 Aylin Tezel as Canan
 Vedat Erincin as Hüseyin
 Fahri Ögün Yardim as Hüseyin (young)
 Lilay Huser as Fatma
 Demet Gül as Fatma (young)
 Aykut Kayacik as Veli
 Aycan Vardar as Veli (young)
 Ercan Karacayli as Muhamed
 Kaan Aydogdu as Muhamed (young)
 Şiir Eloğlu as Leyla
 Aliya Artuc as Leyla (young)
 Petra Schmidt-Schaller as Gabi
 Denis Moschitto as Ali
 Axel Milberg as a German official
 Tim Seyfi as a vegetable trader
 Aglaia Szyszkowitz as a doctor
 Katharina Thalbach as a woman in the subway
 Saskia Vester as a neighbour

Plot
Six year-old Cenk Yılmaz begins to question his identity in his German school one day when he isn't chosen for either the German or the Turkish soccer team. He is the son of Ali, of Turkish heritage, and his German wife, Gabi, and Cenk cannot speak Turkish. At a family meal his Grandmother Fatma declares to the family her newly acquired German citizenship. At the same meal, Grandfather Hüseyin tells the family that he has bought a house in Turkey that he wants to use as a summer home. In order to renovate the house, he wants to travel to Turkey with the whole family.

Cenk's 22-year-old cousin Canan is pregnant with the child of her British boyfriend David but she has not told the family yet. She begins to tell Cenk the story of how their Grandfather came to Germany in the 1960s as the 1,000,001st guest worker to help fill the worker shortage. She explains how Grandfather Hüseyin brought his family to Germany afterward, the dreams and worries that they brought with them, and the difficulties they faced.

Together, the family flies to Turkey where they rent a bus to drive to their old hometown in East Anatolia to see their new house. Hüseyin guesses that Canan is pregnant and reacts with understanding. Hüseyin receives an invitation to give a speech at an official thank-you ceremony for guest workers at Bellevue Palace. After driving further, Hüseyin suddenly dies and since he recently received German citizenship, Turkish authorities refuse to allow him to be buried in a Muslim cemetery. Instead, the family brings his body to his old hometown and they bury him there. Cenk sees all the generations of his family in their various ages collected around the grave.

The house bought by Hüseyin turns out to be a ruin. His son, Muhamed, decides to stay in Turkey to rebuild it, since he is unemployed in Germany. The rest of the family returns to Germany. Cenk gives the speech that Hüseyin prepared in front of Chancellor Angela Merkel.

Awards
 2011 German Film Award Deutscher Filmpreis for Best Script in Gold and Best Film in Silver

References

External links
 

2011 films
2011 comedy-drama films
2010s German-language films
German comedy-drama films
2010s Turkish-language films
Films set in West Germany
Films set in Germany
Films set in Turkey
2011 multilingual films
German multilingual films
2010s German films